The 1953 Ole Miss Rebels football team represented the University of Mississippi during the 1953 college football season. The Rebels were led by seventh-year head coach Johnny Vaught and played their home games at Hemingway Stadium in Oxford, Mississippi (and one alternate site game in Jackson, Mississippi). They competed as members of the Southeastern Conference, finishing in a three-way tie for second with a record of 7–2–1 (4–1–1 SEC). They were not invited to a bowl game.

Schedule

Roster
C Ed Beatty
QB Eagle Day, So.
Billy Kinard
Harol Lofton
Bobby McCool
OG Crawford Mims

References

Ole Miss
Ole Miss Rebels football seasons
Ole Miss Rebels football